Coleophora napolovi is a moth of the family Coleophoridae.

References

napolovi
Moths described in 2002